Linichthys laticeps is a species of cyprinid fish endemic to China where it is found the in upper and middle Zhu Jiang basin and the upper Chang Jiang basin in the city of Guiyang, Guizhou Province.  It is the only member of its genus. This species reaches a length of 
.

Etymology
The genus is named after Lin Ren-Duan. A Chinese ichthyologist.

References

Zhang, E. and F. Fang, 2005. Linichthys: a new genus of Chinese cyprinid fishes (Teleostei: Cypriniformes). Copeia 2005(1):61-67.

Cyprinid fish of Asia
Freshwater fish of China
Taxa named by Lin Ren-Duan
Taxa named by Zhang Chun-Guang
Fish described in 1986